The Kabyle people ( or Leqbayel or Iqbayliyen) are a Berber ethnic group indigenous to Kabylia in the north of Algeria, spread across the Atlas Mountains,  east of Algiers. They represent the largest Berber-speaking population of Algeria and the second largest in North Africa.

Many of the Kabyles have emigrated from Algeria, influenced by factors such as the Algerian Civil War, cultural repression by the central Algerian government, and overall industrial decline. Their diaspora has resulted in Kabyle people living in numerous countries. Large populations of Kabyle people settled in France and, to a lesser extent, Canada (mainly Québec) and United States.

The Kabyle people speak Kabyle, a Berber language. Since the Berber Spring of 1980, they have been at the forefront of the fight for the official recognition of Berber languages in Algeria.

History

Fatimid Caliphate

Between 902 and 909 the Fatimid state had been founded by the Kutama Berbers from Lower Kabylie whose conquest of Ifriqiya resulted in the creation of the Caliphate. After the conquest of Ifriqiya the Kutama Berbers conquered the realm of the Rustamids on the way to Sijilmasa which they also then briefly conquered and where Abdullāh al-Mahdī Billa, who at the time was imprisoned, was then freed and then accepted as the Imam of the movement and installed as the Caliph, becoming the first Caliph and the founder of the ruling dynasty. The historian Heinz Halm describes the early Fatimid state as being "a hegemony of the Kutama and Sanhaja Berbers over the eastern and central Maghrib" and Prof. Dr. Loimeier states that rebellions against the Fatimids were also expressed through protest and opposition to Kutama rule. The weakening of the Abbasids allowed Fatimid-Kutama power to quickly expand and in 959 Ziri ibn Manad, Jawhar the Sicilian and a Kutama army conquered Fez and Sijilmasa in Morocco.
 In 969 under the command of Jawhar, the Fatimid Kutama troops conquered Egypt from the Ikhsidids, the Kutama Berber general Ja'far ibn Fallah was instrumental in this success: he led the troops that crossed the river Nile and according to al-Maqrizi, captured the boats used to do this from a fleet sent by Ikhshidid loyalists from Lower Egypt. The Kutama general Ja’far then invaded Palestine and conquered Ramla, the capital, he then conquered Damascus and made himself the master of the city and then he moved north and conquered Tripoli. It was around this time period that the Fatimid Caliphate reached its territorial peak of 4,100,000 km2.

Zirid Dynasty

The Zirid Dynasty was a family of Sanhadja Berbers with origins in the Kabyle mountains. During their reign they established their rule over the entire Maghreb and also established rule in parts of Andalusia. They also had suzerainty over the Emirate of Sicily through the Kalbite emirs and later assassinated the ruler and took over the island. When the Emirate of Sicily was split into separate taifas, Ayyub Ibn Tamim entered Sicily and united all of the taifas under his rule until he left the island.

Hammadid Dynasty

The Hammadids came to power after declaring their independence from the Zirids. They managed to conquer land in all of the Maghreb region, capturing and possessing significant territories such as: Algiers, Béjaïa, Tripoli, Sfax, Susa, Fez, Ouargla and Sijilmasa. South of Tunisia, they also possessed a number of oases that were the termini of trans-Saharan trade routes.

Kingdom of Ait Abbas and Kingdom of Kuku

These two Kabyle Kingdoms managed to maintain their independence and participated in notable battles alongside the Regency of Algiers, such as the campaign of Tlemcen and the conquest of Fez. In the early 16th century Sultan Abdelaziz of the Beni Abbes managed to defeat the Ottomans several times, notably in the First Battle of Kalaa of the Beni Abbes.

The Kabyle were relatively independent of outside control during the period of Ottoman Empire rule in North Africa. They lived primarily in three different kingdoms: the Kingdom of Kuku, the Kingdom of Ait Abbas, and the principality of Aït Jubar. Kabylia was the last part of northern Algeria to be colonised by the French during the years 1854-1857, despite vigorous resistance. Such leaders as Lalla Fatma n Sumer continued the resistance as late as Mokrani's rebellion in 1871.

Kabyle villages were ruled through an indirect administration based on the preservation of Kabyle traditional political institutions such as the village’s assemblies djemaas, this institution played a central role in the Kabyle’s self-governing. The djemaas would resolve disputes between the village’s inhabitants and edict the customary law rules. French officials confiscated much land from the more recalcitrant tribes and granted it to colonists, who became known as pieds-noirs During this period, the French carried out many arrests and deported resisters, mainly to New Caledonia in the South Pacific. Due to French colonization, many Kabyle emigrated to other areas inside and outside Algeria. Over time, immigrant workers also began to go to France.

In the 1920s, Algerian immigrant workers in France organized the first party promoting Algerians independence. Messali Hadj, Imache Amar, Si Djilani Mohammed, and Belkacem Radjef rapidly built a strong following throughout France and Algeria in the 1930s. They developed militants who became vital to the fighting for an independent Algeria. This became widespread after World War II.

Since Algeria gained independence in 1962, tensions have arisen between Kabylie and the central government on several occasions. In July 1962, the FLN (National Liberation Front) was split rather than united. Indeed, many actors who contributed to independence wanted a share of power but the ALN (National Liberation Army) directed by Houari Boumédiène, joined by Ahmed Ben Bella, had the upper hand because of their military forces.

In 1963 the FFS party of Hocine Aït Ahmed contested the authority of the FLN, which had promoted itself as the only party in the nation. Aït Ahmed and others considered the central government led by Ben Bella authoritarian, and on September 3, 1963, the FFS (Socialist Forces front) was created by Hocine Aït Ahmed. This party grouped opponents of the regime then in place, and a few days after its proclamation, Ben Bella sent the army into Kabylie to repress the insurrection. Colonel Mohand Oulhadj also took part in the FFS and in the Maquis (fr) because he considered that the mujahideen were not treated as they should be. In the beginning, the FFS wanted to negotiate with the government but since no agreement was reached, the maquis took up arms and swore not to give them up as long as democratic principles and justice were a part of the system. But after Mohand Oulhadj's defection, Aït Ahmed could barely sustain the movement and after the FLN congress on April 16, 1964, which reinforced the government's legitimacy, he was arrested in October 1964. As a consequence, the insurrection was a failure in 1965 because it was hugely repressed by the forces of the ALN, under Houari Boumédiène. In 1965 Aït Ahmed was sentenced to death, but later pardoned by Ben Bella. Approximately 400 deaths were counted amongst the maquis.

In 1980, protesters mounted several months of demonstrations in Kabylie demanding the recognition of Berber as an official language; this period has been called the Berber Spring. In 1994–1995, the Kabyle conducted a school boycott, termed the "strike of the school bag". In June and July 1998, they protested, in events that turned violent, after the assassination of singer Matoub Lounès and passage of a law requiring use of the Arabic language in all fields.

In the months following April 2001 (called the Black Spring), major riots among the Kabyle took place following the killing of Masinissa Guermah, a young Kabyle, by gendarmes. At the same time, organized activism produced the Arouch, and neo-traditional local councils. The protests gradually decreased after the Kabyle won some concessions from President Abdelaziz Bouteflika.

On 6 January 2016, Tamazight was officially recognized in Algeria's constitution as a language equal to Arabic.

Geography 

The geography of the Kabyle region played an important role in the people's history. The difficult mountainous landscape of the Tizi Ouzou and Bejaia provinces served as a refuge, to which most of the Kabyle people retreated when under pressure or occupation. They were able to preserve their cultural heritage in such isolation from other cultural influences.

The area supported local dynasties (Numidia, Fatimids in the Kutama periods, Zirids, Hammadids, and Hafsids of Bejaïa) or Algerian modern nationalism, and the war of independence. The region was repeatedly occupied by various conquerors. Romans and Byzantines controlled the main road and valley during the period of antiquity and avoided the mountains (Mont ferratus). During the spread of Islam, Arabs controlled plains but not all the countryside (they were called el aadua: enemy by the Kabyle).

The Regency of Algiers, under Ottoman influence, tried to have indirect influence over the people (makhzen tribes of Amraoua, and marabout).

The French gradually and totally conquered the region and set up a direct administration. 

Algerian provinces with significant Kabyle-speaking populations include Tizi Ouzou, Béjaïa and Bouira, where they are a majority, as well as Boumerdes, Setif, Bordj Bou Arreridj, and Jijel. Algiers also has a significant Kabyle population, where they make up more than half of the capital's population.

The Kabyle region is referred to as Al Qabayel ("tribes") by the Arabic-speaking population and as Kabylie in French. Its indigenous inhabitants call it Tamurt Idurar ("Land of Mountains") or Tamurt n Iqbayliyen/Tamurt n Iqbayliyen ("Land of the Kabyle"). It is part of the Atlas Mountains and is located at the edge of the Mediterranean.

Culture and society

Language 

The Kabyle ethnic group speak Kabyle, a Berber language of the Afro-Asiatic family. As second and third languages, many people speak Algerian Arabic and French.

During the first centuries of their history, Kabyles used the Tifinagh writing system. Since the beginning of the 19th century, and under French influence, Kabyle intellectuals began to use the Latin script. It is the basis for the modern Berber Latin alphabet.

After the independence of Algeria, some Kabyle activists tried to revive the Old Tifinagh alphabet. This new version of Tifinagh has been called Neo-Tifinagh, but its use remains limited to logos. Kabyle literature has continued to be written in the Latin script.

Religion 
The Kabyle people are mainly Muslim, with a small Christian minority. Many Zawaya exist all over the region; the Rahmaniyya is the most prolific.

Catholics of Kabyle background generally live in France. Recently, the Protestant community has had significant growth, particularly among Evangelical denominations.

Economy 
The traditional economy of the area is based on arboriculture (orchards and olive trees) and on the craft industry (tapestry or pottery). Mountain and hill farming is gradually giving way to local industry (textile and agro-alimentary). In the middle of the 20th century, with the influence and funding by the Kabyle diaspora, many industries were developed in this region. It has become the second most important industrial region in the country after Algiers.

Politics 

The Kabyle have been fierce activists in promoting the cause of Berber (Amazigh) identity. The movement has three groups: those Kabyle who identify as part of a larger Berber nation (Berberists); those who identify as part of the Algerian nation (known as "Algerianists", some view Algeria as an essentially Berber nation); and those who consider the Kabyle to be a distinct nation separate from (but akin to) other Berber peoples (known as Kabylists).
 Two political parties dominate in Kabylie and have their principal support base there: the Socialist Forces Front (FFS), led by Ali Laskri who replaced Hocine Aït Ahmed, and the Rally for Culture and Democracy (RCD), led by Mohcine Belabbès who replaced Saïd Sadi. Both parties are secularist, Berberist and Algerianist.
 The Arouch emerged during the Black Spring of 2001 as a revival of the village assembly, a traditional Kabyle form of democratic organization. The Arouch share roughly the same political views as the FFS and the RCD.
 The Movement for the Autonomy of Kabylie (MAK) also emerged during the Black Spring, It claimed the right for a regional autonomy of Kabylie. On 21 April 2010, MAK proclaimed a Provisional Government of Kabylie in exile (ANAVAD). Ferhat Mehenni was elected president by the National Council of the MAK. In 2013, MAK officially became an independentist movement and changed its name to the Movement for the Self-Determination of Kabylie.

Diaspora 
For historical and economic reasons, many Kabyles have emigrated to France, both for work and to escape political persecution. They now number around 1 million people. Some notable French people are of full or partial Kabyle descent.

Notable people

Sport 

 Samir Aït Saïd
 Mohamed Allek
 Larbi Benboudaoud
 Karim Benzema
 Soraya Haddad
 Loucif Hamani
 Cherif Hamia
 Kheira Hamraoui
 Mohand Cherif Hannachi
 Rabah Madjer
 Kylian Mbappé
 Mahieddine Meftah
 Sarah Ourahmoune
 Moussa Saïb
 Hocine Soltani
 Zinedine Zidane

Business 

 Alexandre Djouhri
 Issad Rebrab

Cinema 

 Isabelle Adjani
 M'hamed Arezki
 Ramzy Bedia
 Yamina Benguigui
 Yasmine Bleeth
 Dany Boon
 Habiba Djahnine
 Fellag
 Jalil Lespert
 Marie-José Nat
 Daniel Prévost
 Rouiched
 Erika Sawajiri
 Jacques Villeret
 Malik Zidi

Music 

 Abderrahmane Abdelli
 Lounis Aït Menguellet
 Assia
 Slimane Azem
 Chimène Badi
 Alain Bashung
 Chérifa
 Malika Domrane
 Idir
 Mohamed Iguerbouchène
 Marina Kaye
 Souad Massi
 Matoub Lounes
 Kamel Messaoudi
 Emma Saïd Ben Mohamed
 Marcel Mouloudji
 El Hadj M'Hamed El Anka
 Rilès
 Sinik
 DJ Snake
 Soolking
 Rachid Taha
 Takfarinas

Paint 

 M'hamed Issiakhem
 Hamid Tibouchi

Politics 

 Abane Ramdane
 Ferhat Abbas
 Belaïd Abrika
 Hocine Aït Ahmed
 Amirouche Aït Hamouda
 Lucius Alfenus Senecio
 Nasir ibn Alnas
 Fadela Amara
 Sheikh Amokrane
 Belkacem Lounes
 Mohand Arav Bessaoud
 Lalla Fatma n Sumer
 Firmus
 Salima Ghezali
 Ferhat Imazighen Imoula
 Krim Belkacem
 Saïd Mohammedi
 Rachid Nekkaz
 Belkacem Radjef
 Saïd Sadi
 Buluggin ibn Ziri

Science 

 Mouloud Aït Mammar
 Si Amar
 Mohammed Arkoun
 Salem Chaker
 Mustapha Ishak-Boushaki
 Noureddine Melikechi
 Rachid Ouyed
 Si Saïd
 Abdelmalek Sayad
 Mohand Tazerout
 Tassadit Yacine

Literature 

 Arezki Aït Larbi
 Taos Amrouche
 Tahar Djaout
 Nabile Farès
 Mouloud Feraoun
 Si Mohand
 Salem Zenia

See also 
 List of Kabyle people

Notes and references

External links 

 Provisional Government of Kabylie (ANAVAD)
 Kabyle Movement of Autonomy
 Kabyle centric news site 
 Social web site
 Kabyle centric news site 
 Ethnologue.com about Kabyle language
 Algerian linguistic policy 
 Cultural site 
 Analysis

 
Ethnic groups in Algeria
Indigenous peoples of North Africa
Berber peoples and tribes